Pelkan-e Olya (also Romanized as Pelkān-e ‘Olyā and Palkān-e ‘Olyā; also known as Āb Sardeh-ye Soflá, Palkān-e ‘Alā’īn, and Pellehkān-e Bālā) is a village in Hemmatabad Rural District, in the Central District of Borujerd County, Lorestan Province, Iran. At the 2006 census, its population was 155, in 37 families.

References 

Towns and villages in Borujerd County